This is a non-exhaustive list of football clubs in Argentina, which is ordered according to the division they currently play in. 

There are two national divisions in Argentina (Primera Division and Primera B Nacional). Below this level, leagues are split between those for clubs directly affiliated to the Argentine Football Association (mainly clubs from Greater Buenos Aires, but also some from the rest of the Buenos Aires Province and the Santa Fe Province), and those affiliated indirectly through their local leagues to the Association (covering the rest of the country). Clubs below the Primera B Nacional who are directly affiliated play in the Primera B Metropolitana, Primera C and Primera D, while those indirectly affiliated play in the Argentino A, Argentino B and Argentino C. 

These leagues make up the first five tiers of Argentine football. Below the fifth tier, there are various regional leagues for clubs indirectly affiliated. On the other hand, clubs directly affiliated have no league below the fifth (Primera D), therefore a club relegated from the Primera D has to spend one year without playing (disaffiliated).

Primera Division (2019) 

(Source for team names:)

Primera B Nacional (2019)

Metropolitana

Primera B Metropolitana (2014)

Primera C Metropolitana (2014)

Primera D Metropolitana (2014)

Disaffiliated

Rest of the Country

2018–19 Torneo Federal A

Zone A

1 Play their home games at Estadio José María Minella.

Zone B

Zone C

Zone D

Local Leagues 
The following is an incomplete list of clubs currently playing at the regional level, sorted by province and league.

List of regional football leagues in Argentina

References

External links 
 Sitio Oficial de AFA   
 Ascenso del Interior  
 Interior Futbolero 
 Promiedos  

Argentina
 
clubs
Football clubs